Zeynel Doğan (born 10 October 1979) is a Kurdish actor and film director.

Doğan graduated with a degree in Journalism from Anadolu University in 2002. In conjunction with Özgür Doğan and Orhan Eskiköy, he founded the initiative Perişan Film. He also coordinates the Diyarbakır Media Center, which trains local youth in contemporary video practice.

Filmography
Feature films 
Voice of My Father, as Mehmet, 2012 (also credited as director)

Awards
As director
 The Golden Boll for Best Film (Voice of My Father, 2012)
 The Golden Boll for Best Screenplay (Voice of My Father, 2012)
 Istanbul Film Festival Best Screenplay Award (Voice of My Father, 2012)

References

External links
Zeynel Doğan on Imdb
Perişan Film
Interview with Zeynel Doğan on Cineuropa

Living people
Kurdish film directors
1979 births